August Arthur Petry (1858, Tilleda - 1932  Nordhausen) was a German botanist and entomologist specialising in Microlepidoptera.
He was a teacher of philology at the Gymasium in Nordhausen. August Petry was a Member of the Stettin Entomological Society.Ottmar Hofmann honoured his name  in Caryocolum petryi. His collections are, in part, held by the Natural History Museum of Erfurt.

Works
Petry, A., (1889) Die Vegetationsverhältnisse des Kyffhäuser Gebirges Halle a.S. Tausch & Grosse 1889 (Dissertation:	Zugl.: Halle-Wittenberg, Univ., Diss., 1889)
Petry, A., (1904) Beschreibung neuer Microlepidopteren aus Korsika. Entomologische Zeitung, Stettin 65(): 242–254.
Petry, A. (1904) Zur Naturgeschichte der Lita nitentella Fuchs Entomologische Zeitung Stettin  65: 176 - 179.
Petry, A. (1912) Ueber die deutschen an Artemisia lebenden Arten der Gattung Bucculatrix Z. nebst Beschreibung einer neuen Art. Deutsche entomologische Zeitschrift Iris 26 (2): 111-115. Dresden
Beiträge zur Fauna Thüringens Erfurt; Krefeld Goecke (1936). 2 Microlepidoptera, Kleinschmetterlinge. with Curt Beer, Ernst Hockemeyera and Otto Rapp 
Petry, A. (1936) Beitrag zur Schmetterlingsfauna des Harzes Erfurt, Zu erhalten durch den Bearbeiter with Otto Rapp

References

Groll, E. K. 2017: Biographies of the Entomologists of the World. – Online database, version 8, Senckenberg Deutsches Entomologisches Institut, Müncheberg – URL: sdei.senckenberg.de/biografies
Zobodat

19th-century German botanists
German lepidopterists
1932 deaths
1858 births
20th-century German botanists
People from Mansfeld-Südharz